Phyllonorycter macedonica is a moth of the family Gracillariidae. It is known from North Macedonia and Greece.

The larvae feed on Crataegus laciniata. They mine the leaves of their host plant. They create a lower surface tentiform mine.

References

macedonica
Moths of Europe
Moths described in 1971